Orosh (or ) is a small village in Mirditë within the county of Lezhë in the northwest of the Republic of Albania. Geographically, it is located inside the mountainous region of northern Albania in the Valley of Fan.

The seat of the former municipality was the town of Reps. The former Orosh Abbey was located in the municipality. Terenzio Tocci gathered the Mirdita chieftains on April 26, 1911, in Orosh, proclaimed the independence of Albania, raised the flag of Albania and established the provisional government.

Notable peoples 
Prênk Bibë Doda
Kapidan Marka Gjoni
Gjon Markagjoni
Bibë Dodë Pasha

References 

Villages in Lezhë County
Populated places in Mirditë
Administrative units of Mirditë
Former municipalities in Lezhë County